The Kamangars are a Muslim community in North India and Pakistan. Kamangar may also refer to:

Kamangar, Iran, a village in Iran
Kamangar Kola (disambiguation), several villages in Iran
Dadaneh Kamangar, a village in Iran
Kamangar (surname)